Jeannie Seely is a studio album by American country artist Jeannie Seely. Her fifth studio release, the album was issued in April 1969 on Decca Records and was produced by Owen Bradley. The record was Seely's first with the Decca label after recording for several years with Monument Records. Although the album was released on a major label, it did not chart on any Billboard publications upon its release.

Background and content
Jeannie Seely was recorded in several sessions in January 1969. The album was produced at Bradley's Barn, a studio in Nashville, Tennessee owned by Owen Bradley. The sessions were Seely's first with Bradley, after working for several years with Fred Foster. The album consisted of 11 tracks, some of which were new recordings while others were cover versions of songs previously recorded. Among the album's cover versions was the ninth track, "Walkin' After Midnight", originally cut by Patsy Cline. The second track, "Wichita Lineman", was first cut by Glen Campbell. Some album tracks were written by Hank Cochran, Seely's husband at the time. Cochran wrote the first track, "Just Enough to Start Me Dreamin'", as well as two additional album tracks. Although Seely had previously recorded music by Cochran, such recordings were cut at Monument Records. Seely's self-titled album would be her first with the Decca label.

Release and reception
Jeannie Seely was officially released in April 1969 on Decca Records. It was issued as a vinyl record, with six songs on the first side and five on the opposite side.  Unlike her previous album releases, Jeannie Seely did not chart on any Billboard publications after its release. The album included one single that was released in February 1969, "Just Enough to Start Me Dreamin'". The single only became a minor hit on the Billboard Hot Country Singles chart, peaking at number 43 in May 1969. Billboard gave the album a positive review in their publication dated from 1969. "Miss Seely also delivers, in fine style, three other Cochran numbers, plus other top material in this highly salable LP," critics commented.

Track listing

Personnel
All credits are adapted from the liner notes of Jeannie Seely.

 Owen Bradley – producer
 Harlan Howard – liner notes
 Jeannie Seely – lead vocals

Release history

References

1969 albums
Albums produced by Owen Bradley
Decca Records albums
Jeannie Seely albums